Solana Beach School District is a public school district located in San Diego County, California, United States, that serves the communities of Solana Beach, Carmel Valley, Fairbanks Ranch, and Rancho Santa Fe. The district was founded in 1925 and encompasses seven elementary schools and a Child Development Center. Enrollment consists of approximately 3,000 students in grades pre-kindergarten through 6th grades. The district is governed by a five-member Board of Education.

Schools
Carmel Creek
Skyline k-6
Solana Highlands
Solana Pacific
Solana Ranch
Solana Santa Fe
Solana Vista

References

External links

School districts in San Diego County, California
1925 establishments in California
School districts established in 1925